Shen Sheng (born January 17, 1979 in Wuhan, Hubei) is a male Chinese sports sailor who has competed with Team China at the 2008 Summer Olympics.

Major performances
1999/2001/2004 National Championships - 1st Laser class;
2000/2006/2007 National Championships - 2nd/3rd/3rd Laser class;
2001 National Games - 1st Laser class;
2002 National Championships/Asian Games - 1st Laser Radial;
2006 Asian Games - 6th Laser class

References
 http://2008teamchina.olympic.cn/index.php/personview/personsen/835

1979 births
Living people
Chinese male sailors (sport)
Olympic sailors of China
Sailors at the 2008 Summer Olympics – Laser
Asian Games medalists in sailing
Sportspeople from Wuhan
Sailors at the 2006 Asian Games
Sailors at the 2002 Asian Games
Medalists at the 2002 Asian Games
Asian Games gold medalists for China
21st-century Chinese people